Cynthia Rogerson (born 14 August 1953) is an American-born writer of mainstream literary fiction set in Scotland and California. Originally from California, she now lives in the Scottish Highlands.

Novels and short story collections 
 Upstairs in the Tent - Headline Review (2000)
 Love Letters from my Deathbed - Two Ravens Press (2007)
 I Love You, Goodbye - Black and White (2011). Shortlisted for Creative Scotland Book of the Year Award 2010
 Stepping Out and Other Stories - Salt (2010)
 If I Touched the Earth - Black and White (2012)
 Wait for Me Jack - Sandstone (2017, as Addison Jones)

Awards 
V.S. Pritchett Prize 2008
Best Scottish Novel 2011 (shortlisted)

Work 
Rogerson is program director at Moniack Mhor Writers Centre, as well as a Royal Literary Fellow in Dundee and a manuscript assessor for The Literary Consultancy.

References

External links
Official website

1953 births
Living people
21st-century American women writers